Christian Voice is an American conservative political advocacy group, known as part of the Christian right within U.S. politics. In 1980, Christian Voice claimed 107,000 members including 37,000 pastors from 45 denominations. Christian Voice was headquartered at the Heritage Foundation in the 1970s and 1980s and is currently located in suburban Washington, D.C., in Alexandria, Virginia.

Christian Voice was among a group of four prominent Christian Right groups formed in 1978 and 1979.  Christian Voice, Moral Majority, The Religious Roundtable and the National Christian Action Coalition all enjoyed considerable popularity during Ronald Reagan's Presidency.

Christian Voice is best known as the originator and developer of the Moral Report Cards the "Congressional Report Card" and the "Candidates Scorecard" that were issued mainly between the years 1980 and 1984. It helped organize grassroots action through use of its "Church Networking Guide".

History
Christian Voice, founded by Reverends Dr. Robert Grant and Richard Zone in 1978, was formed out of several California anti-gay and anti-pornography organizations.  Evangelical minister Pat Robertson, who later formed the Christian Coalition, furnished some early financial resources for the organization. Paul Weyrich, the leader of the conservative think tank the Heritage Foundation and the chief architect of the Christian right movement which the Christian Voice was a part of, met with Grant in 1976 and agreed to let Grant set up headquarters for his future organization at the headquarters of the Heritage Foundation.  Weyrich, a member of the Melkite Greek Catholic Church, then recruited former Nixon administration official Howard Phillips, a Jew who converted to Evangelical Christianity, and was known for leading crusades to "defund the Left," and direct mail king Richard Viguerie, a Roman Catholic to help develop Grant's organization.

Christian Voice made its reputation as a lobbying organization, owing mostly to Grant's decision to hire Gary Jarmin, a Washington insider and Republican politico, to run Christian Voice's lobbying efforts on Capitol Hill. Jarmin, in a Francis Schaeffer and Frank Schaeffer "co-belligerent" strategy also later mimicked by Ralph E. Reed Jr. of the Christian Coalition, urged Jews, fundamentalists, Roman Catholics, Pentecostals and charismatics, and others to put aside their differences and work together for common notions of political change.  This stood Christian Voice in contrast to Moral Majority, the Religious Roundtable and the National Christian Action Coalition, all of which were more narrowly fundamentalist in their ideology and were initially less willing to build political bridges to other religious communities.  Weyrich, Viguerie and Phillips also abandoned the group in 1978 after Grant announced that the Christian Voice was "a sham" that was "controlled by three Catholics and a Jew;" they then decided to align with rising televangelist Jerry Falwell and form the Moral Majority.

Christian Voice sought to counter US President Jimmy Carter's influence over the American Christian community. A Democrat who embraced the born-again Christian label, Carter gained high levels of popularity among Christian conservatives during his 1976 campaign.  After he took office, however, Carter disappointed many Christian conservatives by supporting the Panama Canal Treaty and by taking what many Christian conservatives considered to be a soft stance on Communism. This perception caused Christian Voice and other Christian right organizations to rally behind Republican nominee Ronald Reagan in 1980.  During the 1980 US Presidential election, Christian Voice organized "Christians for Reagan" as a subdivision with the group and it also sponsored an advertising campaign that implied Carter approved of homosexual lifestyles.  The group gained even further notoriety when it issued "moral report cards" to grade the social voting patterns of members of Congress.

Christian Voice was the first of the Christian Right groups, pre-dating the Christian Coalition, American Coalition for Traditional Values, Concerned Women for America, Moral Majority, Family Research Council, and other Christian political groups.  Christian Voice has employed hundreds of political organizers, including Susan Hirschman, Chief of Staff to former House Majority Leader Tom DeLay, Congressman Tom Hagadorn, who chaired the organization for several years, and Tim LaHaye, co-author of the Left Behind series.  At one point, US Senators Orrin Hatch (Utah), Roger Jespen (Iowa) and James McClure (Idaho) all served on the organization's board of directors.  Many of the techniques used by current independent and 527 political campaigns were originally developed by Christian Voice (Most notably, a commonly used "Political Report Card" used to inform voters of how their representative voted was created by Christian Voice chief architect Colonel V. Doner).

Decline
The group's bare-knuckle politics angered many Christian Voice supporters, including some of the Congressmen on the board of directors.  Christian Voice's primary legislative objective, a constitutional amendment to allow prayer in public schools, failed near the end of Reagan's first term.  After Reagan's second term began, Christian Voice shifted its activities away from lobbying and toward the publication of campaign literature, especially the aforementioned "report cards."  The group claimed to have distributed some 30 million report cards during the 1986 election cycle.  However, funding and leadership flagged after the 1986 elections, which saw Republicans lose control of the US Senate, and many of the key members of Christian Voice fled to form the American Freedom Coalition with funding from Unification Church leader Sun Myung Moon.

As of 2012, the Christian Voice was still maintained by the American Service Council as a vehicle for direct mail campaigns both the targeting of voters and contributors and the delivery of petitions to the U.S. federal government. The American Service Council no longer lists the Christian Voice on its own web site nor maintains a separate Christian Voice web site.

Principals
 Terry Dolan
 Colonel V. Doner, Chief Strategist (1978-1986)
 Robert Grant, Founder, Chairman and CEO (1978-1998; 2003-2008)
 Richard Viguerie

References

American Christian political organizations
Political organizations based in the United States
Conservative organizations in the United States
Companies based in Alexandria, Virginia
1978 establishments in the United States
Christian organizations established in 1978